The Antifascist United Front  (FUA) - [] was a political organization founded on June 25, 1933 in the city of São Paulo to oppose fascism, represented in Brazil by the Brazilian Integralist Action (AIB). FUA was created on the initiative of Communist League (LC), Brazilian Socialist Party (PSB), Italian anti-Fascist immigrants and other leftist minority organizations.  Two important segments of São Paulo's left at the time, the anarchists and militants of the Communist Party of Brazil (PCB), did not formally participate in the FUA, but they maintained contacts and articulated themselves with the Antifascist front on some occasions.

History 
FUA, together with other sectors of the left, held a series of anti-fascist demonstrations and demonstrations, and its militants played an important role in the Battle of the Praça da Sé. Until February 1934, the year in which the organization ceased its activities, FUA edited the newspaper O Homem Livre, considered the main vehicle of antifascist propaganda of that period.

Throughout 1934, with the advance of fascism in Europe and the reform of the policies of the Communist International (Comintern), which aimed at the formation of popular fronts, FUA opened space for the formation of a broader front of progressive sectors, the antifascist struggle in the more general struggle for reforms and against the conservative forces, which culminated in the formation of the National Liberation Alliance (ANL) in 1935.

Foundation 
A week after the ceremony in honor of Giacomo Matteotti, on June 25, a meeting was held in the hall of the Civic Union 5 de Julho, in which the Anti-fascist United Front was constituted. The meeting was chaired by Francesco Frola and was attended by organizations such as São Paulo's PSB, Communist League (LC), Union of Graphic Workers (UTG), Socialist University Guild, 5 de Julho Civic Legion, Flag of 18, Giacomo Socialist Group Matteotti, O Homem Livre newspaper, A Rua newspaper, O Socialismo magazine, Grupo Italia Libera, São Paulo Workers Federation (FOSP) and the anarchist newspapers A Lanterna and A Plebe. The PCB and the entities linked to it were invited, but did not attend.

References

Communism in Brazil
Political movements in Brazil